Jan Fredrik "Janken" Varden (born 6 April 1938) is a graduate of The University of Oslo, Law School, stage director and theatre educator. He was born in Oslo. In 1966 he married poet Kate Næss (died 1987), and from 1989 he lived with Danish actress Birgitte Halling-Koch. He has worked as stage director at Riksteatret - The Norwegian Itinerary Theatre, Nationaltheatret - The National Theatre of Norway, Fjernsynsteatret, - Television Theatre, and many others. He headed the Norwegian National Theatre School 1976–81, He was head of and first director at Oslo Nye Teater from 1989 to 1996. He headed the Danish National School of Theatre and Contemporary Dance from 1998 to 2003, and has been decorated Knight of the Danish Order of the Dannebrog as well as Knight of the Norwegian order of Saint Olav.

References

1938 births
Living people
Theatre people from Oslo
Norwegian theatre directors
Knights of the Order of the Dannebrog